Shekar Sara (also Romanized as Shekār Sarā) is a village in Belesbeneh Rural District, Kuchesfahan District, Rasht County, Gilan Province, Iran. At the 2006 census, its population was 608, in 157 families.

References 

Populated places in Rasht County